Saltz is a surname. Notable people with this surname include:

 Anton Saltz, also known as Anton Yegorovich von Saltza
 Danny Saltz (born 1961), American tennis player
 Gail Saltz, American psychiatrist, psychoanalyst, columnist and television commentator
 Jerry Saltz (born 1951), American art critic
 Lee Saltz (born 1963), American American football player
 Nathan J. Saltz (1912–2003), American-born Israeli doctor